Skarhead is an American hardcore punk band from New York City, founded and fronted by Lord Ezec a.k.a. Danny Diablo (of Crown of Thornz). The group is considered the originators of thugcore music, a subgenre of hardcore punk "full of relentless breakdowns and throwdown-ready posturing". They have toured with Gwar, Hatebreed, and Earth Crisis. They have been cited as an influence by Deez Nuts and Fucked Up.

Members 
 Dan Singer (of Crown of Thornz) – lead vocals
 White Owl (formerly of White Trash) – bass
 Mitts (from Madball) – guitar
 Goat (from Murphy's Law & Misfits) – drums
 Hoya Roc (from Madball) – guitar
 Puerto Rican Mike (from District 9) – vocals
 AK RAY (from Vietnom) – guitars

Discography

References 

https://www.faygoluvers.net/v5/2022/01/skarhead-set-to-release-first-new-single-in-10-years/

External links 

Rapcore groups
Hardcore punk groups from New York (state)
Victory Records artists